The Department of Urban Development & Municipal Affairs  is a West Bengal government department. It is an interior ministry mainly responsible for the administration of the urban development and municipal affairs in West Bengal.

List of Municipal Corporation 

 Kolkata Municipal Corporation
 Bidhannagar Municipal Corporation
 Howrah Municipal Corporation
 Chandannagar Municipal Corporation
 Durgapur Municipal Corporation
 Asansol Municipal Corporation
 Siliguri Municipal Corporation

List of Development Authority 
 Kolkata Metropolitan Development Authority
 Newtown - Kolkata Development Authority
 Gangasagar - Bakkhali Development Authority
 Tarkeswar Development Authority
 Furfura Sharif Development Authority
 Burdwan Development Authority
 Asansol - Durgapur Development Authority
 Mukutmanipur Development Authority
 Haldia Development Authority
 Midnapore - Kharagpur Development Authority
 Digha - Sankarpur Development Authority
 Birsingha Development Authority
 Mohabani Development Authority
 Sriniketan - Santiniketan Development Authority
 Tarapith - Rampurhat Development Authority
 Bakreswar Development Authority
 Patharchapuri Development Authority
 Siliguri - Jalpaiguri Development Authority
 Gazoldoba Development Authority
 Changrabandha Development Authority
 Jaigaon Development Authority

History 
The urban governance through the ‘Urban Local Bodies' (ULBs) i.e. Municipal Corporations, Municipalities and Notified Area Authorities , in the state of West Bengal dates back to British regime in 18th.century. The first municipal mechanism created during British rule was the Municipal Corporation, set up in the former presidency town of Madras (today Chennai) in 1688 with a view to transfer the financial responsibility of local administration to the newly created corporation. The Mayor's Courts were established in each of the three Presidency towns, Madras, Bombay and Calcutta through the Royal Charter of 1720. In 1882, the then Victory of India, Lord Ripon's resolution of local self-government laid the democratic forms of municipal governance in India. The current form and the structure of municipal bodies are based on Lord Ripon's Resolutions, which was adopted in 1882 as local self-government. The Government of India Act, 1919 incorporated the need for conferment of power to a democratically elected government. This act has another development towards the evolution of urban local bodies in India. In 1935, another Government of India Act brought the local government under the purview of the state of the provincial government and specific powers were given, to those local self-governments.

As a matter of fact, Kolkata Municipal Corporation or “KMC” (earlier known as Calcutta Municipal Corporation) is one of the oldest municipal bodies of the country. In 1726, a Mayor's court was established by a Royal Charter. With the expansion of British Government by making Calcutta as a capital of British India in 1773, the municipal services grow up. In 1847 the electoral system was introduced for the first time and the idea of Calcutta Corporation begins to start. In 1876 a new Corporation was created with 72 Commissioners. In 1923, Corporation stands its existence by important changes by Rashtraguru Surendranath Bannerjee, the 1st minister for local self government. The Calcutta Corporation act, 1980 changed the existing system of the corporation. This alteration was more effective and more systematic so far municipal service is concerned, which came into force in 1984.

References

Government departments of West Bengal

West Bengal